Heigrujam Daya Devi (born 4 April 2000) is an Indian international footballer who plays as a winger for the India women's national team.

Honours

India
 South Asian Games Gold medal: 2019

Manipur
 Senior Women's National Football Championship: 2019–20

References

External links
 Soumya Guguloth at All India Football Federation

2000 births
Footballers from Manipur
Sportswomen from Manipur
India women's international footballers
Indian women's footballers
India women's youth international footballers
Living people
People from Thoubal district
Women's association football wingers
Kryphsa F.C. Players
Gokulam Kerala FC Women players
Indian Women's League players
South Asian Games gold medalists for India
South Asian Games medalists in football